The Braille pattern dots-1345 is a 6-dot braille cell with both top, the middle right, and bottom left dots raised, or an 8-dot braille cell with both top, the upper-middle right, and lower-middle left dots raised. It is represented by the Unicode code point U+281d, and in Braille ASCII with N.

Unified Braille

In unified international braille, the braille pattern dots-1345 is used to represent the alveolar nasal, i.e. /n/, and  otherwise as needed.

Table of unified braille values

Other braille

Plus dots 7 and 8

Related to Braille pattern dots-1345 are Braille patterns 13457, 13458, and 134578, which are used in 8-dot braille systems, such as Gardner-Salinas and Luxembourgish Braille.

Related 8-dot kantenji patterns

In the Japanese kantenji braille, the standard 8-dot Braille patterns 2567, 12567, 24567, and 124567 are the patterns related to Braille pattern dots-1345, since the two additional dots of kantenji patterns 01345, 13457, and 013457 are placed above the base 6-dot cell, instead of below, as in standard 8-dot braille.

Kantenji using braille patterns 2567, 12567, 24567, or 124567

This listing includes kantenji using Braille pattern dots-1345 for all 6349 kanji found in JIS C 6226-1978.

  - 土

Variants and thematic compounds

  -  selector 4 + つ/土  =  庄
  -  selector 4 + selector 4 + つ/土  =  甬
  -  selector 6 + つ/土  =  尭
  -  つ/土 + selector 1  =  士
  -  つ/土 + selector 4  =  域
  -  比 + つ/土  =  貫
  -  つ/土 + を/貝  =  売
  -  つ/土 + つ/土 + を/貝  =  賣

Compounds of 土

  -  selector 1 + つ/土  =  堊
  -  仁/亻 + つ/土  =  佳
  -  れ/口 + つ/土  =  吐
  -  れ/口 + つ/土 + つ/土  =  哇
  -  囗 + つ/土  =  周
  -  ゑ/訁 + つ/土  =  調
  -  ひ/辶 + つ/土  =  週
  -  氷/氵 + 囗 + つ/土  =  凋
  -  る/忄 + 囗 + つ/土  =  惆
  -  の/禾 + 囗 + つ/土  =  稠
  -  い/糹/#2 + 囗 + つ/土  =  綢
  -  む/車 + 囗 + つ/土  =  蜩
  -  よ/广 + つ/土  =  圧
  -  ろ/十 + つ/土  =  在
  -  る/忄 + ろ/十 + つ/土  =  恠
  -  ん/止 + つ/土  =  址
  -  り/分 + つ/土  =  坪
  -  ぬ/力 + つ/土  =  型
  -  き/木 + つ/土  =  基
  -  龸 + つ/土  =  堂
  -  め/目 + 龸 + つ/土  =  瞠
  -  む/車 + 龸 + つ/土  =  螳
  -  た/⽥ + つ/土  =  塁
  -  に/氵 + つ/土  =  塗
  -  う/宀/#3 + つ/土  =  塞
  -  お/頁 + つ/土  =  塾
  -  く/艹 + つ/土  =  墓
  -  そ/馬 + つ/土  =  墜
  -  し/巿 + つ/土  =  墨
  -  ま/石 + つ/土  =  壁
  -  つ/土 + つ/土  =  封
  -  し/巿 + つ/土 + つ/土  =  幇
  -  て/扌 + つ/土  =  掛
  -  氷/氵 + つ/土  =  涯
  -  ね/示 + つ/土  =  社
  -  ね/示 + つ/土 + つ/土  =  褂
  -  ね/示 + つ/土 + れ/口  =  襭
  -  む/車 + つ/土  =  蛙
  -  ゆ/彳 + つ/土  =  街
  -  も/門 + つ/土  =  閨
  -  さ/阝 + つ/土  =  陛
  -  せ/食 + つ/土  =  鮭
  -  つ/土 + ち/竹  =  地
  -  つ/土 + ん/止  =  坂
  -  つ/土 + も/門  =  均
  -  つ/土 + ほ/方  =  坊
  -  つ/土 + 宿  =  坑
  -  つ/土 + 日  =  垣
  -  つ/土 + む/車  =  埃
  -  つ/土 + り/分  =  埋
  -  つ/土 + ひ/辶  =  城
  -  つ/土 + へ/⺩  =  埒
  -  つ/土 + つ/土 + へ/⺩  =  埓
  -  つ/土 + ま/石  =  培
  -  つ/土 + け/犬  =  埼
  -  つ/土 + と/戸  =  堀
  -  つ/土 + す/発  =  堅
  -  る/忄 + つ/土 + す/発  =  慳
  -  心 + つ/土 + す/発  =  樫
  -  か/金 + つ/土 + す/発  =  鏗
  -  せ/食 + つ/土 + す/発  =  鰹
  -  つ/土 + い/糹/#2  =  堆
  -  つ/土 + ら/月  =  堕
  -  つ/土 + つ/土 + ら/月  =  墮
  -  つ/土 + よ/广  =  堤
  -  つ/土 + き/木  =  堪
  -  つ/土 + 数  =  場
  -  つ/土 + つ/土 + 数  =  塲
  -  つ/土 + つ/土 + 数  =  塲
  -  つ/土 + に/氵  =  塊
  -  つ/土 + は/辶  =  塑
  -  つ/土 + く/艹  =  塔
  -  つ/土 + う/宀/#3  =  塚
  -  つ/土 + ⺼  =  塩
  -  つ/土 + な/亻  =  境
  -  つ/土 + そ/馬  =  増
  -  つ/土 + ふ/女  =  墳
  -  つ/土 + る/忄  =  壊
  -  つ/土 + つ/土 + る/忄  =  壞
  -  つ/土 + み/耳  =  壌
  -  つ/土 + し/巿  =  寺
  -  や/疒 + つ/土 + し/巿  =  峙
  -  る/忄 + つ/土 + し/巿  =  恃
  -  た/⽥ + つ/土 + し/巿  =  畤
  -  つ/土 + 日 + し/巿  =  塒
  -  つ/土 + か/金  =  幸
  -  つ/土 + お/頁  =  執
  -  て/扌 + つ/土 + お/頁  =  摯
  -  む/車 + つ/土 + お/頁  =  蟄
  -  つ/土 + ゐ/幺  =  報
  -  な/亻 + つ/土 + か/金  =  倖
  -  囗 + つ/土 + か/金  =  圉
  -  す/発 + つ/土 + か/金  =  睾
  -  つ/土 + 龸 + せ/食  =  鷙
  -  つ/土 + て/扌  =  捏
  -  つ/土 + つ/土 + み/耳  =  壤
  -  つ/土 + 比 + な/亻  =  圦
  -  つ/土 + 比 + 龸  =  圷
  -  つ/土 + や/疒 + selector 1  =  圸
  -  つ/土 + 比 + を/貝  =  圻
  -  つ/土 + ん/止 + selector 1  =  坎
  -  つ/土 + selector 4 + ふ/女  =  坏
  -  つ/土 + selector 4 + ひ/辶  =  坡
  -  つ/土 + selector 5 + し/巿  =  坤
  -  つ/土 + selector 4 + 日  =  坦
  -  つ/土 + selector 4 + る/忄  =  坩
  -  つ/土 + な/亻 + し/巿  =  坿
  -  つ/土 + 仁/亻 + 囗  =  垈
  -  つ/土 + も/門 + selector 2  =  垉
  -  つ/土 + selector 5 + ゐ/幺  =  垓
  -  つ/土 + 宿 + や/疒  =  垠
  -  つ/土 + 宿 + れ/口  =  垢
  -  つ/土 + 龸 + と/戸  =  垪
  -  つ/土 + 比 + う/宀/#3  =  垰
  -  つ/土 + 宿 + ゆ/彳  =  垳
  -  つ/土 + 囗 + selector 6  =  埆
  -  つ/土 + 宿 + ほ/方  =  埔
  -  つ/土 + く/艹 + 比  =  埖
  -  つ/土 + き/木 + き/木  =  埜
  -  つ/土 + さ/阝 + ふ/女  =  埠
  -  つ/土 + お/頁 + ろ/十  =  埣
  -  つ/土 + ろ/十 + め/目  =  埴
  -  つ/土 + ら/月 + ら/月  =  堋
  -  つ/土 + 宿 + か/金  =  堝
  -  つ/土 + な/亻 + れ/口  =  堡
  -  つ/土 + 宿 + も/門  =  堰
  -  つ/土 + 宿 + 日  =  堵
  -  つ/土 + た/⽥ + 宿  =  堺
  -  つ/土 + 宿 + へ/⺩  =  塀
  -  火 + 宿 + つ/土  =  塋
  -  つ/土 + よ/广 + も/門  =  塘
  -  つ/土 + 比 + え/訁  =  塙
  -  つ/土 + せ/食 + う/宀/#3  =  塢
  -  つ/土 + selector 1 + め/目  =  填
  -  つ/土 + に/氵 + は/辶  =  塰
  -  つ/土 + そ/馬 + 比  =  塵
  -  つ/土 + む/車 + を/貝  =  塹
  -  つ/土 + り/分 + よ/广  =  墅
  -  つ/土 + す/発 + 火  =  墟
  -  つ/土 + せ/食 + し/巿  =  墫
  -  つ/土 + と/戸 + く/艹  =  墸
  -  つ/土 + も/門 + 日  =  墹
  -  つ/土 + 囗 + の/禾  =  墺
  -  つ/土 + 囗 + れ/口  =  墻
  -  つ/土 + 宿 + ひ/辶  =  壅
  -  つ/土 + た/⽥ + selector 1  =  壑
  -  よ/广 + よ/广 + つ/土  =  壓
  -  つ/土 + 龸 + そ/馬  =  壕
  -  つ/土 + ふ/女 + 火  =  壗
  -  た/⽥ + た/⽥ + つ/土  =  壘
  -  つ/土 + よ/广 + こ/子  =  壙
  -  つ/土 + 日 + ち/竹  =  壜
  -  つ/土 + ま/石 + 心  =  壟
  -  氷/氵 + 宿 + つ/土  =  汢
  -  に/氵 + 宿 + つ/土  =  涅
  -  ⺼ + 宿 + つ/土  =  肚
  -  つ/土 + 比 + に/氵  =  堙
  -  つ/土 + 宿 + よ/广  =  壥
  -  つ/土 + selector 4 + ゆ/彳  =  垤
  -  つ/土 + 宿 + つ/土  =  圭
  -  つ/土 + 宿 + と/戸  =  卦
  -  す/発 + 宿 + つ/土  =  罫
  -  れ/口 + 宿 + つ/土  =  啀
  -  け/犬 + 宿 + つ/土  =  奎
  -  ふ/女 + 宿 + つ/土  =  娃
  -  や/疒 + 龸 + つ/土  =  崕
  -  や/疒 + う/宀/#3 + つ/土  =  崖
  -  つ/土 + 宿 + 心  =  恚
  -  て/扌 + 宿 + つ/土  =  挂
  -  心 + 宿 + つ/土  =  桂
  -  へ/⺩ + 宿 + つ/土  =  珪
  -  め/目 + 宿 + つ/土  =  睚
  -  ま/石 + 宿 + つ/土  =  硅
  -  ね/示 + 宿 + つ/土  =  袿
  -  と/戸 + 宿 + つ/土  =  鞋
  -  つ/土 + た/⽥  =  畦
  -  し/巿 + つ/土 + つ/土  =  幇

Compounds of 庄

  -  の/禾 + つ/土  =  粧
  -  を/貝 + selector 4 + つ/土  =  賍

Compounds of 甬

  -  み/耳 + つ/土  =  踊
  -  は/辶 + つ/土  =  通
  -  き/木 + は/辶 + つ/土  =  樋
  -  や/疒 + つ/土  =  痛
  -  仁/亻 + 宿 + つ/土  =  俑
  -  き/木 + 宿 + つ/土  =  桶
  -  に/氵 + 龸 + つ/土  =  涌
  -  る/忄 + 宿 + つ/土  =  慂
  -  え/訁 + 宿 + つ/土  =  誦
  -  せ/食 + 龸 + つ/土  =  鯒

Compounds of 尭

  -  日 + つ/土  =  暁
  -  日 + 日 + つ/土  =  曉
  -  火 + つ/土  =  焼
  -  火 + 火 + つ/土  =  燒
  -  に/氵 + selector 6 + つ/土  =  澆
  -  く/艹 + selector 6 + つ/土  =  蕘
  -  な/亻 + 宿 + つ/土  =  僥
  -  や/疒 + 宿 + つ/土  =  嶢
  -  ま/石 + 龸 + つ/土  =  磽
  -  い/糹/#2 + 宿 + つ/土  =  繞
  -  つ/土 + む/車 + selector 2  =  翹
  -  む/車 + 宿 + つ/土  =  蟯
  -  ひ/辶 + 宿 + つ/土  =  遶
  -  か/金 + 宿 + つ/土  =  鐃
  -  せ/食 + 宿 + つ/土  =  饒
  -  そ/馬 + 宿 + つ/土  =  驍

Compounds of 士

  -  つ/土 + selector 1 + selector 1  =  壼
  -  つ/土 + 宿 + selector 1  =  壷
  -  つ/土 + 龸 + selector 1  =  壺
  -  な/亻 + つ/土  =  仕
  -  へ/⺩ + つ/土  =  壮
  -  つ/土 + ね/示  =  装
  -  つ/土 + つ/土 + ね/示  =  裝
  -  へ/⺩ + へ/⺩ + つ/土  =  壯
  -  け/犬 + へ/⺩ + つ/土  =  奘
  -  と/戸 + へ/⺩ + つ/土  =  弉
  -  つ/土 + れ/口  =  吉
  -  つ/土 + 囗  =  喜
  -  ふ/女 + つ/土  =  嬉
  -  つ/土 + ぬ/力  =  嘉
  -  な/亻 + つ/土 + 囗  =  僖
  -  る/忄 + つ/土 + 囗  =  憙
  -  き/木 + つ/土 + 囗  =  橲
  -  火 + つ/土 + 囗  =  熹
  -  ね/示 + つ/土 + 囗  =  禧
  -  せ/食 + つ/土 + 囗  =  鱚
  -  な/亻 + つ/土 + れ/口  =  佶
  -  ぬ/力 + つ/土 + れ/口  =  劼
  -  て/扌 + つ/土 + れ/口  =  拮
  -  き/木 + つ/土 + れ/口  =  桔
  -  お/頁 + つ/土 + れ/口  =  頡
  -  い/糹/#2 + つ/土 + れ/口  =  纈
  -  と/戸 + つ/土 + れ/口  =  髻
  -  し/巿 + つ/土 + れ/口  =  黠
  -  を/貝 + つ/土  =  贖
  -  つ/土 + 心  =  志
  -  や/疒 + つ/土 + 心  =  痣
  -  つ/土 + の/禾  =  穀

Compounds of 売

  -  え/訁 + つ/土  =  読
  -  つ/土 + ゑ/訁  =  殻
  -  つ/土 + つ/土 + ゑ/訁  =  殼
  -  る/忄 + つ/土 + ゑ/訁  =  愨
  -  い/糹/#2 + つ/土  =  続
  -  に/氵 + つ/土 + を/貝  =  涜
  -  つ/土 + つ/土 + を/貝  =  賣
  -  へ/⺩ + つ/土 + を/貝  =  牘
  -  そ/馬 + つ/土 + を/貝  =  犢
  -  め/目 + つ/土 + を/貝  =  覿
  -  し/巿 + つ/土 + を/貝  =  黷
  -  つ/土 + う/宀/#3 + り/分  =  竇
  -  い/糹/#2 + い/糹/#2 + つ/土  =  續
  -  え/訁 + え/訁 + つ/土  =  讀

Compounds of 貫

  -  る/忄 + つ/土  =  慣
  -  き/木 + 比 + つ/土  =  樌

Other compounds

  -  つ/土 + 龸  =  先
  -  か/金 + つ/土  =  銑
  -  ち/竹 + つ/土 + 龸  =  筅
  -  み/耳 + つ/土 + 龸  =  跣
  -  つ/土 + こ/子  =  去
  -  つ/土 + さ/阝  =  却
  -  ぬ/力 + つ/土 + こ/子  =  劫
  -  に/氵 + つ/土 + こ/子  =  溘
  -  も/門 + つ/土 + こ/子  =  闔
  -  つ/土 + 宿 + ⺼  =  盍
  -  ⺼ + つ/土  =  爪
  -  て/扌 + ⺼ + つ/土  =  抓
  -  ひ/辶 + ⺼ + つ/土  =  爬
  -  ち/竹 + ⺼ + つ/土  =  笊
  -  心 + つ/土  =  瓜
  -  れ/口 + 心 + つ/土  =  呱
  -  き/木 + 心 + つ/土  =  柧
  -  け/犬 + 心 + つ/土  =  瓠
  -  む/車 + 心 + つ/土  =  瓣
  -  つ/土 + つ/土 + ⺼  =  鹽
  -  つ/土 + 宿 + せ/食  =  燕
  -  え/訁 + 龸 + つ/土  =  讌

Notes

Braille patterns